Luke 20 is the twentieth chapter of the Gospel of Luke in the New Testament of the Christian Bible. It records the teaching of Jesus Christ in the temple in Jerusalem, especially his responses to questions raised by the Pharisees and Sadducees. The book containing this chapter is anonymous, but early Christian tradition uniformly affirmed that Luke the Evangelist composed this Gospel as well as the Acts of the Apostles.

Text
The original text was written in Koine Greek. This chapter is divided into 47 verses.

Textual witnesses
Some early manuscripts containing the text of this chapter are:
Papyrus 75 (written about AD 175-225)
Codex Vaticanus (325-350)
Codex Sinaiticus (330-360)
Codex Bezae (c. 400)
Codex Washingtonianus (c. 400)
Codex Alexandrinus (400-440)
Codex Ephraemi Rescriptus (c. 450; extant verses 1-27)

Old Testament references
: Psalm 118:22
: : the Levirate law
: : the passage about the burning bush
: Psalm

Jesus’ Authority Questioned (20:1-8)
Luke follows  with some abbreviation, and with some material peculiar to himself.

One day, as he was teaching the people in the temple and telling the good news, the chief priests and the scribes came with the elders ...
The New King James Version reads "on one of those days", reflecting the additional word εκεινων (ekeinōn), inserted into the Textus Receptus. This word, added "for greater precision", is missing "from the authorities of greatest importance, condemned by Johann Jakob Griesbach, and deleted by Karl Lachmann and Constantin von Tischendorf".

Luke presents Jesus continuing to teach 'the people' in the Temple, who are "presented as favourably disposed to him", but when the chief priests, scribes and elders question him about his authority, Jesus raises a question in return about the origin of John's baptism. Those who have questioned him decline to answer, stating that they "did not know where it came from".

Parable of the Wicked Vinedressers (20:9-19)

This parable of Jesus, also known as the Parable of the Wicked Husbandmen, is found in three of the four canonical gospels (Mark , and Matthew ), and also in the non-canonical Gospel of Thomas. It describes a householder planting a vineyard and letting it out to husbandmen, who failed in their duty. The owner sent various servants successively to collect a share of the proceeds of the harvest, but each time the husbandmen rejected them. Unlike the texts in Matthew and Mark, Luke states that "perhaps" (isōs, "probably" in the NKJV and in Marvin Vincent's interpretation)  they will respect the owner's son. The word ἴσως is not used elsewhere in the New Testament. As the parable continues, the wicked husbandmen conspire to kill the son, in the expectation that the vineyard would pass to them. Finally, the owner comes and "destroys" those husbandmen and gives the vineyard to others.

Verse 16
He will come and destroy those vinedressers and give the vineyard to others.”And when they heard it they said, 'Certainly not!' In the climax of the story it is announced that the owner will come, to "destroy" those husbandmen and gives the vineyard to others. In Matthew's version, the proposal is put forward by those listening to the parable.
"Certainly not!", or "No - never!", (mē genoito), is a characteristically Pauline phrase used here only within the Gospels but frequently in  Paul’s Epistles: see Romans 6#The Bearing of Justification by Grace upon a Holy Life.

Verses 17–18Then He looked at them and said, "What then is this that is written:
 'The stone which the builders rejected
Has become the chief cornerstone'?
Whoever falls on that stone will be broken; but on whomever it falls, it will grind him to powder."
These words, alluding to Isaiah 8:14–15, are tied to verse 16 as a response to μὴ γένοιτο. "What then ..." or "Why then ...", ti oun,  infers the negation of μὴ γένοιτο: "How then, supposing your wish to be fulfilled, could this which is written come to pass?"

This parable concerned the chief priests and Pharisees and was given to the people present in the Temple during the final week before the death of Jesus.

The Pharisees' question: Is It lawful to pay taxes to Caesar? (20:20-26)

A question about the tribute money: 
And they asked him, saying, Master, we know that thou sayest and teachest rightly, neither acceptest thou the person of any, but teachest the way of God truly.
F. W. Farrar's opinion is that "There is something in this fawning malice, and treacherous flattery, almost as repulsive as the kiss of Judas."

Verse 20
So they watched Him, and sent spies who pretended to be righteous, that they might seize on His words, in order to deliver Him to the power and the authority of the governor.
These tactics are slightly different from the way they are presented by Matthew and Mark: they sent some Pharisees and some Herodians to trap him .... Luke is "on the one hand, less definite as to the parties to the conspiracy than the other Gospels, and on the other hand more explicit as to its aim". In this verse, Luke anticipates the events of Jesus' trial, when having questioned him before the Sanhedrin, they "arose and led Him to Pilate".

The Sadducees' question: What about the resurrection? (20:27-40)
Then some of the Sadducees, who deny that there is a resurrection, came to Him and asked ...
Using the example of a woman who has successively married seven brothers in accordance with the Mosaic rule of levirate marriage prescribed by Deuteronomy 25:5, the Sadducees put "something of a trick question" to Jesus, exploring "the sense in which life after death can be meaningful". Farrar notes that verses 27-39 relate the discomfiture of the Sadducees.

No further questions (20:40)
, and similarly , record that after this series of partisan questions, the scribes concluded that they were not able to outwit Jesus and "after that they dared not question Him anymore".

American theologian Albert Barnes suggests that "never was wisdom more clear, never more triumphant"; Farrar, in the Cambridge Bible for Schools and Colleges, reflects that at this point events became more perilous for Jesus as his opponents recognised that they would be unable "to pose themselves as superiors to [him] in wisdom and knowledge", and contempt was therefore "deepened into real hatred".

Beware of the scribes (20:41-47)
Verse 46 ("Beware of the scribes, who desire to go around in long robes, love greetings in the marketplaces, the best seats in the synagogues, and the best places at feasts ...") recalls the second of Luke's woes to the Pharisees:
Woe to you Pharisees! For you love the best seats in the synagogues and greetings in the marketplaces.

See also 
 Burning bush
 David
 Jerusalem
 John the Baptist
 Ministry of Jesus
 Moses
 Parables of Jesus
 Other related Bible parts: Exodus 3, Joshua 10, Psalm 110, Psalm 118, Matthew 21, Matthew 22, Matthew 23, Matthew 25, Mark 11, Mark 12, Acts 2, Acts 5; Romans 8; Hebrews 1, Hebrews 5, Hebrews 6, Hebrews 7, Hebrews 10, Hebrews 12

References

External links 
 King James Bible - Wikisource
English Translation with Parallel Latin Vulgate
Online Bible at GospelHall.org (ESV, KJV, Darby, American Standard Version, Bible in Basic English)
Multiple bible versions at Bible Gateway (NKJV, NIV, NRSV etc.)

Gospel of Luke chapters